The Wollongong Botanic Garden is located in the Wollongong suburb of Keiraville at the foot of Mount Keira in New South Wales, Australia. It is the local botanical gardens of the Illawarra and was established in 1964. It was opened in September 1970.

The garden is co-located with the historic Gleniffer Brae house, used for functions and the Wollongong Conservatorium of Music.

A number of annexes are managed by the garden - Puckeys Estate Reserve in Fairy Meadow, the Korrongulla Wetlands in Primbee and the Mount Keira Summit Park.

Garden features

The garden features various themed areas, including a rose garden, herb garden, woodland garden, azalea bank, succulent plants and several rainforest areas divided into Illawarra rainforest, subtropical rainforest, dry rainforest and exotic rainforest. A creek runs through the garden and into a small lake. This creek joins Para Creek and runs into Puckeys Estate Reserve.

The azalea garden and succulent garden are both local attractions, and many tourists are seen taking pictures of the flowers. Local university students study plants here.

One of the better known attractions is the Japanese-style wooden bridge over the creek. It was built as a gift of friendship to symbolise the connection with Wollongong's sister city in Japan, Kawasaki and restored in the early 2000s. Another is the BHP fountain at the northern entrance facing the university. Its distinctive shape has put it on the local art tour.

The lake is a local attraction and features a boardwalk to a rotunda in the centre. It is inhabited by ducks and geese and seagulls frequent.

See also
 Auburn Botanical Gardens
 Puckeys Estate Reserve
 List of botanical gardens

External links
Wollongong Botanic Garden website

Photos of Wollongong Botanical Gardens

References 

Botanical gardens in New South Wales
Tourist attractions in Wollongong
1970 establishments in Australia
Woodland gardens